Anne Burns is a British-born Australian educational linguist internationally known for her work on genre-based pedagogy in TESOL and EAP/ESP. She is Professor Emerita in Language Education at Aston University (UK) and Professor of TESOL at the University of New South Wales (Australia). The TESOL International Association named her one of the '50 at 50', leaders who had made a significant contribution to TESOL in its first 50 years.

Biography 
Burns was born and educated in Wales, UK. She received a Bachelor of Arts with Honors in English Literature from the University of Wales (1966); a PhD from Macquarie University (1994); and a Master of Education, also from Macquarie University (1996). She was formerly the associate director of the National Centre for English Language Teaching and Research (NCELTR), the Commonwealth Government's Key Research Centre for the Adult Migrant English Program (AMEP) (2000-2005), Director of the Applied Linguistics and Language in Education (ALLE) Research Centre, Macquarie University (2005–2010), and Dean of Linguistics and Psychology at Macquarie University (2000–2005). 

Currently she holds named chair appointments and distinguished professor appointments at several academic institutions in the UK, Australia, and Hong Kong. She also has been a Visiting Professor in New Zealand, Sweden, Japan and Thailand. Some other recent appointments include Academic Adviser for the Applied Linguistics Series, Oxford University Press (2012–present), chair of the TESOL Research Standing Committee (2009–2012), chair and Editor for the AILA Applied Linguistics Series (AALS) (2014–2016) and Senior Consultant to Cengage_National Geographic.

Contribution to linguistics 
Burns has published extensively in the field of TESOL on the teaching of speaking and grammar from a genre/Systemic Functional Linguistics (SFL) perspective. She is internationally known for her pioneering work in action research for language teachers, many of whom have focused on genre-based pedagogy in EAP/ESP.

SFL/genre theory 
Burns' edited book with Caroline Coffin, Analysing English in a global context (2001, Routledge), was part of a Masters in Education and Masters in Applied Linguistics Program offered respectively by the Open University (UK), and Macquarie University (Australia). It was adopted extensively by other university programs also as a book of readings.

In addition, with Helen Joyce, she adapted the three part Teaching-Learning Cycle (Callaghan and Rothery 1988) to a four part cycle relevant to TESOL (Hammond et al., 1992). With Jenny Hammond and Helen de Silva Joyce, she conducted two national AMEP projects on the teaching of speaking from a genre/SFL perspective in language classrooms.

Action research 
Burns' books Collaborative action research for English language teachers (1999, CUP) and Doing action research: A guide for practitioners (2010, Routledge) are widely cited in the field of language teacher education. Her work in this area has had a major impact on the growth of the concept of language teacher research. Much of the action research she has conducted with teachers in Australia has included research on genre-based pedagogy/text-based syllabus design and the applications of SFL in the language classroom. She is much admired for her mentorship and engagement with teachers in action research: "her mentorship on the English Australia Action Research Project has helped front-line teachers change their attitudes and approaches in fundamental ways" (English Australia Journal 2017).

Awards and distinctions 
Since 2010, she has been a consultant through English Australia and Cambridge Assessment English to the English Language Intensive Courses for Overseas Students (ELICOS) sector for their annual Action Research in ELICOS Program. In 2013, this program won an International Education Association of Australia award for best practice/innovation.

In 2019, English Australia established an annual award, The Anne Burns Action Research Grant, to acknowledge an ELICOS institution that has taken up or integrated action research as part of their curriculum or staff professional development program.

Publications 
Hammond, J., Burns, A., Joyce, H. Brosnan, D. & Gerot, L. (1992). English for social purposes: A Handbook for Teachers of Adult Literacy. Sydney: National Centre for English Language Teaching and Research.

Burns, A. & de Silva Joyce, H. (1997). Focus on speaking. Sydney: National Centre for English Language Teaching and Research.

Burns, A. (1999). Collaborative action research for English language teachers. New York: Cambridge University Press.

Burns, A. & Coffin, C. (Eds.). (2001). Analysing English in a global context. London: Routledge.

Burns, A. (2010). Doing action research in English language teaching: A guide for practitioners. New York: Routledge.

References 

Year of birth missing (living people)
Living people
Academics of Aston University
Academic staff of the University of New South Wales
Alumni of the University of Wales
Macquarie University alumni
Women linguists